LMA is a private media, music and performing arts specialist institution in Liverpool, London, England offering courses in Acting, Screen Acting, Digital Film & TV Production, Digital Games Art, Music Performance & Industry, Dance and Musical Theatre.

History
Founded by brothers Richard Wallace and Simon Wallace in 2009. In February 2019 Sir Terry Leahy (Former Tesco boss) and Bill Currie (William Currie Group) joined the LMA team as shareholders. Global superstar Robbie Williams is now also part of the LMA team 

LMA have over 900 students  media, music and performing arts students.

In 2020 plans were submitted to Liverpool City Council to convert upper floors of the Metquarter centre into teaching rooms, recording studios and common rooms for students of the Academy.

LMA Choir 
The choir is a vocal group whose members are drawn from current music and musical theatre students and recent graduates.

There are currently 14 members and the choir is led by LMA Creative Director Steph Wallace Carr. Formed in 2016 as a surprise flash-mob at Liverpool ONE singing Bruno Mars’ Just The Way You Are in answer to a request from Steph's friend Carl Gilbertson, who wanted to declare his love for his wife Laura on their 10th anniversary which then became an internet sensation.

They went on to the BBC's (now cancelled) show Pitch Battle, where they finished as runners-up in the show's first episode. Then in autumn 2018 went on the show the x-factor  and  finished in 13th place after they were eliminated in week two.

Campus
 Metquarter, Liverpool L1 6DA and Here East, Queen Elizabeth Olympic Park, London E15 2GW

Courses
LMA offers degree courses, accredited by Staffordshire University and Northampton University, in Dance, Acting, Digital Film and TV Production, Music Performance and Industry, Musical Theatre and Digital Games Art.
It also offers BTEC qualifications.

References

External links
LMA

Educational institutions established in 2009
Mass media in Liverpool
2009 establishments in England
Schools of the performing arts in the United Kingdom
Dance schools in the United Kingdom
University choirs